Charisma Precious Amoe-Tarrant (born 26 May 1999) is a Nauruan-born Australian weightlifter. She competed in the women's +90 kg event at the 2018 Commonwealth Games, winning the silver medal for Nauru. Amoe-Tarrant was selected for the Australian team at the Pacific Games held in Samoa in 2019, winning a bronze medal for the +87 kg snatch. She qualified to represent Australia at the 2020 Summer Olympics in Tokyo, Japan. She finished in 6th place in the women's +87 kg event with a total lift of 243kg. Australia at the 2020 Summer Olympics details her performance in depth.

References

External links
 

1999 births
Living people
Nauruan female weightlifters
Australian female weightlifters
Nauruan emigrants to Australia
Place of birth missing (living people)
Weightlifters at the 2018 Commonwealth Games
Weightlifters at the 2022 Commonwealth Games
Commonwealth Games silver medallists for Nauru
Commonwealth Games bronze medallists for Australia
Commonwealth Games medallists in weightlifting
Olympic weightlifters of Australia
Weightlifters at the 2020 Summer Olympics
Medallists at the 2018 Commonwealth Games